The 1947–48 Hong Kong First Division League season was the 37th since its establishment.

League table

References
 1947–48 Hong Kong First Division table (RSSSF)

Hong Kong First Division League seasons
Hong
football